Interglossa (lit. "between + language") is a constructed language devised by biologist Lancelot Hogben during World War II, as an attempt to put the international lexicon of science and technology, mainly of Greek and Latin origin, into a language with a purely isolating grammar. Interglossa was published in 1943 as just a draft of an auxiliary. Hogben applied semantic principles to provide a reduced vocabulary of just over 880 words which might suffice for basic conversation among peoples of different nationality.

A descendant of Interglossa is Glosa (1970s–), which expanded and made changes to the words of the language.

History 
In 1943 Hogben published Interglossa: A draft of an auxiliary for a democratic world order. As a professor, Hogben had seen how hard it was for the students to memorize the terms of biology, as they were poorly acquainted with etymology and the classical languages. So he began to show them the international Greek and Latin roots of these terms to aid their memory. He started to compile a vocabulary, and later, during World War II at Birmingham, he devised some guidelines of syntax, thus completing the draft of a new auxiliary language especially based on the lexicon of modern science:

Eventually, Hogben became convinced that such an auxiliary language appeared to be more necessary than ever before, so he decided to publish his proposal, insisting that it was simply a draft:

Interglossa might be seen as the draft of its descendant auxiliary language Glosa, which has partly changed and expanded the lexicon.

Alphabet and pronunciation 
Interglossa has a Latin alphabet using the 26 letters of the ISO basic Latin alphabet without any diacritics.

Most letters of the alphabet are pronounced in accordance with the symbols of the international phonetic alphabet, with the following exceptions:
y is equivalent to /i/.
c and q are equivalent to /k/.
ph, th, ch, rh, have respectively the value /f/, /t/, /k/, /r/.
Initial x is /z/, otherwise /ks/.
In the following initial consonant combinations, the first element is silent: ct-, gn-, mn-, pn-, ps-, pt-.

The stress is generally on the penultimate syllable, e.g. billeta (ticket), nesia (island). If the word ends with two vowels (-io, -ia, etc.), these might sound as a diphthong. But Hogben rather keeps a hiatus, stating that the stress in nesia is on the antepenultimate syllable (thus analysed as nE-si-a, not *nE-sia).

Parts of speech 
A classification of parts of speech relevant to an isolating language would not follow the categories appropriate to the flexional system of the Indo-European group. The vocables of Interglossa can be classified following the function of individual vocables in the “sentence-landscape” (p. 32-3):
 Substantives (items no. 483 to 860; and no. 874 to 880; additionally no. 881 to 954): Names for concrete things. Any one of them can act as an adjective, as it increasingly happens in English. Examples (from the sample text below): crati (government), geo (earth), pani (bread), parenta (parent), urani (heaven).
 Parts of the Body (no. 483 to 550)
 Zoological and Botanical terms (no. 551 to 630)
 Geographical names (no. 631 to 668)
 Food, Clothes and Furniture (no. 669 to 702)
 Architectural terms; Shapes and Units (no. 703 to 732)
 Instruments (no. 733 to 783)
 Substances and Manufactured Articles (other than Foods and Clothes) (no. 784 to 808)
 Human Affairs (no. 809 to 860)
 There is a set of generic substantives (no. 47 to 60) used in compounds. Examples: -pe [from persona] (person), dirigo-pe (driver, pilot), tene-pe (keeper), pan-pe (everybody).
 “Amplifiers” (no. 141 to 462; and no. 862 to 873): Abstract words, anyone of which can take the place of a noun, adjective or corresponding adverb. Examples: accido (happening, real, -ity, etc.), demo (population), dirigo / controlo (direction, control, etc.), dyno (power, -ful, etc.), eu (good, -ness, well, etc.), famo (reputation, fame), eu-famo (good fame, glory, etc.), libero (free, -dom), malo (evil), nomino (name), offero (offer, -ing), pardo (forgiving, forgiveness), revero (reverent, -ence).
Some of them do the work of place or time particles (no. 61 to 101). Examples:  (to, toward), apo (away from, etc.), di (day, daily, on (the day...), etc.), epi (on), in (in, inner, etc.), tem (time, while, etc.).
Some of them do the work of associative particles with additional meaning as prepositions and/or conjunctions (no. 102 to 128). Examples: causo (cause, because, etc.), de (of, in relation to, etc.),  (harmony, according to, etc.), hetero (different, unlike, otherwise, etc.), homo (similar, -ly, like), metro (measure, in so far as, etc.), plus (addition, -al, in addition, and, etc.), tendo (aim, will, in order to, etc.).
Some of them do the work of auxiliary verbs (no. 129 to 140). Example: volo (willing, wish, wish to, want to, would like to).
 “Verboids” (no. 463 to 482): Names of processes and states. Examples: acte (do, act, etc.), date (give, etc.), dicte (say, express, etc.), gene (get, etc.), habe (have, etc.), tene (keep, etc.). They may not act like a verb, e.g.: plu malo acte (the evil acts, the sins).
They may form natural combinations with abstract words, analogous to such Basic English constructions. Examples: acte dirigo (direct, control, etc.), acte malo (do evil, sin, trespass), acte pardo (forgive), date libero (give freedom, free), dicte petitio (say a request, request), dicte volo (wish, etc.), habe accido (happen, etc.).
 “Pseudonyms” (no. 1 to 11): They function both as pronouns and as equivalents for nouns or for corresponding adjectives. Examples: na (we, us, our), mu (they, those, etc. (multitude)), su (who... (relative pronoun when subject)), tu (thou, thee, thy, you, your).
 Interrogative, Imperative, Negative and Comparative Particles (no. 41 to 46), two of which allow for question, request or command without deviation from the invariant word-pattern. Examples:  (not, no!), peti (request). While peti is a brief way to express the polite imperative, dicte petitio would be the whole expression.
In the sample text below, the expression dicte volo may be equivalent to the English subjunctive: Na dicte volo; tu Nomino gene revero : hallowed be thy name.
 Articles (no. 12 to 40): General words and numerals which have the function of predicating plurality or otherwise in relation to noun-equivalents (all of which are invariant like English sheep). Examples: pan (all), plu (some, a number of, the), u(n) (a(n), any, the).

“Sentence-landscape” 
For ready recognition, a language free of flexions can benefit from two types of signposts of “sentence-landscape”: articles (see “Parts of Speech”), and terminals (that is, final vowels):
Substantives end in -a or -i..
”Amplifiers” end in -o. (Exceptions are: anni, di, hora, post, pre, tem, ad, contra, epi, ex, extra, in, inter, para, littora, peri, tele, trans, anti, de, minus, per, plus, syn, vice).
“Verboids” end in -e.
Hogben prefers to have this number of exceptions instead of the disadvantage of mutilating a familiar international stem or of unduly lengthening the word. (p. 37)

Syntax 
Interglossa is a purely isolating language like Chinese, not depending on suffixes, neither flexional nor derivational, yet it uses a kind of composites whose second component is a monosyllabic noun. Like in Chinese (and English), composite nouns are essential, and so is the context. According to Hogben, such composite nouns may be self-explicit while we take into account its common context of use  (p. 21).

Interglossa provides a minimal grammar with a series of syntactic rules, yet differing from the usual grammar of inflexional-agglutinative languages like the Indo-European ones:

Lexicon 
Unlike other auxiliary languages, Hogben's Interglossa tends to adopt the international words from Greek, on account of the intense infiltration of Greek roots into everyday life, which come from modern science and technology. For instance: microbe, microphone, telephone, etc. (p. 30).
Even so, a great part of the lexicon is of Latin origin. The term Inter-glossa itself is composed of the Latin inter and the Greek glossa. At times Hogben wavers between Greek and Latin, and suggests pairs of equivalent synonyms (e.g. hypo and infra, soma and corpora), for an eventual international committee to decide between them.

In 1943 Hogben announced the preparation of an additional volume, A short English-Interglossa Dictionary. It seems that this volume was not in fact published. Its manuscript is kept among Hogben's papers at the University of Birmingham, and was put online in 2014.

Sample text 
The following is the Lord's Prayer, in Interglossa “U Petitio de Christi” (p. 242):

Word-list 
Hogben provides a numbered list of 880 words with etymologic clues.(pp. 256–82) Some of the items (about 100) are pairs of synonyms, for example: dirigo / controlo (item no. 185).
Hogben also provides an additional list of 74 international words, so actually there would be a lexicon of 954.
Hogben finally provides an alphabetical list (pp. 249–56), which unfortunately has frequent mistakes in the item numbers (here corrected).
Syllables in bold type are "generic substantives" used in compound words.

References 

International auxiliary languages
Constructed languages introduced in the 1940s
International auxiliary languages introduced in the 1940s